5F-CUMYL-P7AICA (also known as CUMYL-5F-P7AICA or SGT-263) is a pyrrolo[2,3-b]pyridine-3-carboxamide based synthetic cannabinoid that has been sold as a designer drug. It was first identified by the EMCDDA in February 2015.

See also 
 5F-A-P7AICA
 5F-AB-P7AICA
 5F-CUMYL-PINACA
 5F-MDMB-P7AICA
 5F-PCN
 5F-SDB-006
 ADB-P7AICA

References 

Cannabinoids
Designer drugs
Organofluorides
Pyrrolopyridines